On February 10, 1820, George F. Strother (DR), Representative for , resigned, having been appointed as receiver of public money in St. Louis, Missouri.  A special election was held to fill the resulting vacancy

Election results

Moore took his seat on November 13, 1820

See also
List of special elections to the United States House of Representatives

References

Virginia 1820 10
Virginia 1820 10
1820 10
Virginia 10
United States House of Representatives 10
United States House of Representatives 1820 10